In mathematical set theory, a square principle is a combinatorial principle asserting the existence of a cohering sequence of 
short closed unbounded (club) sets so that no one (long) club set coheres with them all.  As such they may be viewed as a kind of
incompactness phenomenon.  They were introduced by Ronald Jensen in his analysis of  the fine structure of the constructible universe L.

Definition
Define Sing to be the class of all limit ordinals which are not regular.  Global square states that there is a system  satisfying:

 ot
 If  is a limit point of  then  and

Variant relative to a cardinal
Jensen introduced also a local version of the principle. If 
 is an uncountable cardinal, 
then  asserts that there is a sequence  satisfying:

 If , then  
 If  is a limit point of  then 

Jensen proved that this principle holds in the constructible universe for any uncountable cardinal κ.

Notes

Set theory
Constructible universe